Below is a list of squads used in the 1992 Arab Cup, counted also for the 1992 Pan Arab Games football tournament.

Group A

Egypt
Coach: Mahmoud El-Gohary

|}

Jordan
Coach: Mohammad Awad

|}

Kuwait

Group B

Palestine

Saudi Arabia
Coach:  Nelsinho

|}

Syria

Coach:  Virgil Dridea

|}

External links
 1992 Arab Cup / Pan Arab Games - rsssf.com

Squad
1992